Boule, from French, meaning "ball", is a traditional shape of French bread resembling a squashed ball. A boule can be made using any type of flour and can be leavened with commercial yeast, chemical leavening, or even wild yeast sourdough. The name of this rustic loaf shape is reason the French call bread bakers  and bread bakeries .

See also
 Bread roll

References

French breads